Tivoli Audio is an American manufacturing company notable for producing a line of up-market tabletop radios and related audio products. It was founded in 2000 by Tom DeVesto in collaboration with Henry Kloss. Tivoli Audio is best known for its Model One Radio.

History
The Company was founded in Massachusetts in 2000 by audio engineer Henry Kloss and entrepreneur Tom DeVesto, who noticed a gap in the consumer audio market for high-quality, well designed and affordable audio products. Their first product was the Model One, a simple to use mid-century modern designed table top radio with a high-performance tuner, receiving FM radio in congested urban locations, while maintaining the ability to pick out distant or low power stations. Kloss had noted that the mid 60's wave of Japanese radios lacked the ability to receive FM stations in congested locations, and this became a defining goal of his radio designs throughout his career. Kloss passed away in 2002, but Tivoli Audio continued. By 2006, Tivoli Audio had become a global luxury brand, selling in over 30 countries and gaining recognition in the audio and design world. 
  
As of 2015, the company is operated under new management consisting of Tivoli Audio veterans Paul DePasquale, Chief Executive Officer & Designer, and Dan Atanasov, Chief Financial Officer.  They have developed new products, ideas and opportunities to further diverse and steer Tivoli Audio as a lifestyle brand. DePasquale developed the initiative to connect the brand with the hospitality industry, focusing on products and practices, which have led to global partnerships with Ritz Carlton, Marriott Hotels and Ace Hotels using Tivoli Audio products to enhance their guest’s stay. In 2016, Tivoli Audio launched the ART wireless collection, injecting the latest in audio technology and music features, such as wi-fi streaming and Spotify Connect, while staying true to luxury designs and quality craftsmanship. The company also has continued to explore unique partnerships to expand the brand’s lifestyle approach with new collaborations, such as the 2018 limited-edition model with global fashion brand Supreme.
 
As of 2019, Tivoli Audio opened a flagship showroom and shop on Boston's Newbury Street.

Products
 
After the Model One, the next decade saw several new releases such as the PAL (Portable Audio Laboratory), Model Three (Alarm Clock Radio) and the All-in-one Music System. The DAB+ product range portable PAL+ and PAL+BT received awards and positive reviews over the years for best portable radio as well as best tested from Lyd & Bilde. This range of products, recognizable with the + in the product name experienced success in Scandinavian DAB+ countries like Denmark and Norway since their introductions following the PAL+ in 2011. In 2016, Tivoli Audio further diversified their product line by releasing the ART Collection, featuring wireless streaming and smart home technology in a range of mid-century modern designs.

Tivoli has released many collaborations and special collections. Different styles and finishes were released and collaborations between Tivoli and brands like Coach, Cappallini, Anthropology, NPR, and Supreme.

Product release timeline
 2000:  Model One AM/FM Radio
 2001:  Model Two AM/FM Radio Stereo with subwoofer and CD player
 2002:  PAL (Portable Audio Laboratory)
 2003:  Model Three Alarm Clock Radio with subwoofer and extra speaker
 2004:  Songbook AM/FM Alarm clock travel radio
 2005:  iSongbook Portable Music System with built-in iPod dock
 2006:  Music System All-in-one stereo system
 2007:  iYiYi High-Fidelity stereo system for iPod 
 2008:  Networks Global Audio System with internet capabilities, stereo speaker and CD player  
 2010:  Model 10 AM/FM clock radio; The Connector iPod dock
 2011:  PAL+ Portable radio with DAB/DAB+/FM
 2012:  Model One Bluetooth, PAL BT, Model Three Bluetooth, BlueCon Music Receiver with Bluetooth connectivity, redesign of the Music System to include Bluetooth (Music System BT) and DAB+ (Music System+)
 2013:  Albergo AM/FM clock radio with Bluetooth as well as the DAB+ variant, the Albergo+
 2014:  Music System Three portable Hi-Fi system with AM/FM and BlueTooth connectivity as well as the DAB+ variant (Music System Three+), PAL+BT Portable radio with DAB/DAB+/FM/Bluetooth
 2016:  Art Collection Orb/Sphera, Cube, ConX, limited edition PAL BT GLO 
 2017:  ART Collection Model One Digital, Model One Digital+, Model Sub (Wifi), Model CD (WiFi)
2018:  The PAL+BT received a redesign as well as limited edition models, Tivoli Go line: Andiamo Bluetooth Speaker & Fonico Wireless Stereo Earbuds, Music System Home Hi-Fi system with Amazon Alexa/CD/FM/DAB+,        WiFi and BlueTooth connectivity (DAB+ in selected countries only)
2019:  Revive (desktop lamp and bluetooth speaker with wireless phone charging)

References

External links

Audio equipment manufacturers of the United States